Love v Money may refer to:
 Love vs. Money (The-Dream album), a 2009 R&B album by The-Dream
 Love Versus Money (Noiseworks album), a 1991 rock album by Noiseworks

See also
 For Love or Money (disambiguation)
 Love and Money (disambiguation)
 Love Not Money, a 1985 jangle pop album by Everything but the Girl
 Love of money